Chandni may refer to:

 Chandni (film), a 1989 Indian romantic musical film
 Chandni (Bollywood actress) (fl. 1991–96), Indian actress
 Chandni (Malayalam actress) (fl. 2013–present), Malayalam film actress